Edward Cahill (born 1885 in Beenleigh, Queensland - died 1975 in Monaco) was an Australian concert pianist. Highly regarded and widely travelled in his day, his name has since fallen into obscurity. The author Michael Moran, his grand nephew, has written a biography of Cahill, entitled The Pocket Paderewski: The Beguiling Life of the Australian Concert Pianist Edward Cahill (Australian Scholarly Publishing Melbourne 2016).

Life and career
The glamorous concert pianist Edward Cahill (1885-1975) rose to prominence from humble beginnings in the inauspicious setting of 19th century rural Queensland. At a time when Australian concert artists were relatively unknown in Europe, he dazzled the salons of royalty, aristocratic patronage and privilege in London, Paris and the French Riviera during the glittering decades of the 1920s and 1930s.

His baptism by fire in the travelling silent cinema of the outback, music hall and vaudeville was a surprising grounding for a concert pianist. Yet he became a protégé of Dame Nellie Melba and played for Kings in Southeast Asia and Maharajahs in India. Cahill performed for Queen Mary in London and for the Duke and Duchess of Windsor in Paris. Invited for lessons by the visionary pianist Alfred Cortot, he was known to the great conductor Wilhelm Furtwängler, the pianist and statesman Ignacy Paderewski and the composer Percy Grainger. In London, Cahill gave some of the first recitals in the modern revival of the harpsichord.

His concert tours of Nazi Germany tragically sundered an intense romance and musical partnership with the beautiful Austrian Jewish violinist Sabine Adler. After spending the war years in Switzerland giving charity concerts for interned troops, he took a courageous stand against apartheid as a resident of South Africa, passing his declining years in Monaco.

The search for the enigma of ‘Uncle Eddie’ has been a rich family quest. As a musician, I was fascinated by this charismatic figure, the legend who loitered in the shadows of inherited memory.  Set against the dramatic backdrop of the age, this historical biography is a portrait of the prodigious musical gifts, infectious charm and unswerving determination that transported the pianist Edward Cahill from pastoral isolation to brilliant European stardom.

Reviews
'...this is better than most musical biographies. Moran's portrait of his sometimes enigmatic relative has immediacy and the images of Europe between the wars are vivid.'

(Steven Carroll, Sydney Morning Herald and The Age, 17 February 2017)

Michael Cathcart on ABC RN produced a 20 minute radio segment on Edward Cahill.

'He [Edward Cahill] witnessed the great events of European history from the Dress Circle. Not just a journey through a man's life but a journey through the twentieth century. Written evocatively and powerfully about music.'

References

External links
http://www.abc.net.au/radionational/programs/booksandarts/the-life-of-a-concert-pianist/8285406
Online media: https://app.box.com/s/w470tiq0qbbckttbjb4wvj8936zl60vn

Australian pianists
1885 births
1975 deaths
20th-century Australian pianists